Alleizettella rubra is a species of flowering plant in the family Rubiaceae. It is endemic to northern Vietnam.

References

External links 
 World Checklist of Rubiaceae

Endemic flora of Vietnam
Gardenieae
Vulnerable plants
Taxonomy articles created by Polbot